The 2018–19 NCAA football bowl games were a series of college football bowl games completing the 2018 NCAA Division I FBS football season. The games began on December 15, 2018, and, aside from the all-star games that follow, ended with the 2019 College Football Playoff National Championship, which was played on January 7, 2019.

The total of 40 team-competitive bowls in FBS, including the national championship game, was unchanged from the previous year. To fill the 78 available bowl slots, a total of 10 teams (13% of all participants) with non-winning records (6–6) were invited to bowl games. This was the second consecutive year, and only the third time in eight years, that no teams with losing seasons (6–7 or 5–7) were invited to fill available bowl berths.

Only 39 of the 40 bowls were played, with the First Responder Bowl becoming the first ever postseason game at the FBS-level (or its predecessors) to be cancelled, as a severe lightning storm lingered for over two hours near the Cotton Bowl Stadium. The game was scored as a no-contest for the teams involved.

The three all-star games were the East–West Shrine Game and NFLPA Collegiate Bowl, played on January 19, and the Senior Bowl, played on January 26.

Schedule
The schedule for the 2018–19 bowl games is below. All times are EST (UTC−5).

College Football Playoff and Championship Game
The College Football Playoff system is used to determine a national championship of Division I FBS college football. A 13-member committee of experts ranked the top 25 teams in the nation after each of the last seven weeks. The top four teams in the final ranking play in a single-elimination semifinal round, with the winners advancing to the National Championship game.

The semifinal games for the 2018–19 season were the Cotton Bowl and the Orange Bowl. Both were played on December 29 as part of a yearly rotation of three pairs of six bowls, commonly referred to as the New Year's Six bowl games. The winners advanced to the 2019 College Football Playoff National Championship at Levi's Stadium in Santa Clara, California, on January 7.

Each of the games in the following table was televised by ESPN.

Non-CFP bowl games
For the 2018–19 bowl season, the Gasparilla Bowl was re-located from Tropicana Field to Raymond James Stadium (which already hosts the Outback Bowl). Under new sponsorship deals in comparison to  the prior season's bowl games, the Cactus Bowl was renamed the Cheez-It Bowl, the Heart of Dallas Bowl was renamed the First Responder Bowl, and the Foster Farms Bowl was renamed the Redbox Bowl. The Gator Bowl name was reinstated for the first time since the 2013 season, as it had been known as the TaxSlayer Bowl for the four prior editions.

FCS bowl game
The FCS has one bowl game; they also have a championship bracket that began on November 24 and ended on January 5.

All-star games

Team selections

Generally, a team must have at least six wins to be considered bowl eligible. The College Football Playoff semi-final games are determined based on the top four seeds in the playoff committee's final rankings. The remainder of the bowl eligible teams are selected by each respective bowl based on conference tie-ins, order of selection, match-up considerations, and other factors.

CFP top 25 standings and bowl games

On December 2, 2018, the College Football Playoff selection committee announced their final team rankings for the season.

Three of the four semifinalists – Alabama, Clemson, and Oklahoma – had also been semifinalists the previous season.

Conference champions' bowl games
Three bowls will feature two conference champions playing against each other—the Boca Raton Bowl, Orange Bowl, and Rose Bowl. Rankings are per the above CFP standings.

Bowl–eligible teams
ACC (11): Boston College, Clemson, Duke, Georgia Tech, Miami (FL), NC State, Pittsburgh,  Syracuse,  Virginia, Virginia Tech, Wake Forest
American (7): Cincinnati, Houston, Memphis, South Florida, Temple, Tulane, UCF
Big Ten (9): Iowa, Michigan, Michigan State, Minnesota, Northwestern, Ohio State, Penn State, Purdue, Wisconsin
Big 12 (7): Baylor, Iowa State, Oklahoma, Oklahoma State, TCU, Texas, West Virginia
C-USA (7): FIU, Louisiana Tech, Marshall, Middle Tennessee, North Texas, Southern Miss, UAB
MAC (7): Buffalo, Eastern Michigan, Miami (OH), Northern Illinois, Ohio, Toledo, Western Michigan
Mountain West (7): Boise State, Fresno State, Hawaii, Nevada, San Diego State, Utah State, Wyoming
Pac-12 (7): Arizona State, California, Oregon, Stanford, Utah, Washington, Washington State
SEC (11): Alabama, Auburn, Florida, Georgia, Kentucky, LSU, Mississippi State, Missouri, South Carolina, Texas A&M, Vanderbilt
Sun Belt (6): Appalachian State, Arkansas State, Georgia Southern, Louisiana, Louisiana–Monroe, Troy
Independent (3): Army, BYU, Notre Dame

Number of bowl berths available: 78
Number of bowl-eligible teams: 82

Bowl-eligible teams that did not receive a berth
As there were more bowl-eligible teams than berths available, four teams that were bowl-eligible did not receive an invitation.

Louisiana–Monroe (6–6)
Miami (OH) (6–6)
Southern Miss (6–5)
Wyoming (6–6)

Bowl–ineligible teams
ACC (3): Florida State, Louisville, North Carolina
American (5): East Carolina, Navy, SMU, Tulsa, UConn
Big Ten (5): Illinois, Indiana, Maryland, Nebraska, Rutgers
Big 12 (3): Kansas, Kansas State, Texas Tech
C-USA (7): Charlotte, Florida Atlantic, Old Dominion, Rice, UTEP, UTSA, Western Kentucky
MAC (5): Akron, Ball State, Bowling Green, Central Michigan, Kent State
Mountain West (5): Air Force, Colorado State, New Mexico, San Jose State, UNLV
Pac-12 (5): Arizona, Colorado, Oregon State, UCLA, USC
SEC (3): Arkansas, Ole Miss, Tennessee
Sun Belt (4): Coastal Carolina, Georgia State, South Alabama, Texas State
Independent (3): Liberty, New Mexico State, UMass

Number of bowl-ineligible teams: 48

Television Ratings

Most watched non-CFP bowl games

#CFP Rankings.

College Football Playoff

See also
 Bowl Challenge Cup

Notes

References

Further reading